Post Human: Survival Horror is a commercial release by British rock band Bring Me the Horizon. It was released on 30 October 2020 and is intended to be the first in a series of four projects to be released by the band under the Post Human name. The release was produced by frontman Oliver Sykes and keyboardist Jordan Fish, with additional production from composer Mick Gordon. Stylistically, the release marks return to the heavier and more aggressive metalcore sound of the band's earlier material.

The release was preceded by four singles: "Ludens", which was also previously released as a single on the Timefall soundtrack for Death Stranding, "Parasite Eve", "Obey", and "Teardrops". The release received generally positive reviews from critics and became the band second UK No.1 release.

Background and recording
On 20 March 2020, the band announced that they were in a home studio, writing and recording material for their eighth record, which was expected to be an extended play (EP), with part of it being co-produced by video game composer Mick Gordon. After playing the video game Doom Eternal during the COVID-19 lockdowns and being inspired by Gordon's soundtrack for the game, lead vocalist Oliver Sykes contacted Gordon to help produce the song "Parasite Eve" and the release as a whole. In August 2020, the band's keyboardist Jordan Fish teased that the band was planning on releasing a series of releases. Speaking about the releases, Fish stated:

The band's lead vocalist Sykes also stated that they would be releasing four EPs under the "Post Human" name, stating:

On 2 November 2020, Fish explained in an interview he got the terminology of the record wrong, because it was not supposed to end up with nine tracks on it, revealing:

While Sykes was quarantined during the COVID-19 lockdowns in 2020, he frequently listened to rock duo Nova Twins. Members Amy Love and Georgia South had also quarantined separately following the cancellation of their shows in March 2020. Some time after, the duo were contacted by Jason Aalon Butler—owner of Nova Twins' label 333 Wreckords—who told them that Sykes and Fish wanted to talk to them. The following day, Sykes messaged them on Instagram and sent an unfinished version of "1x1". As Sykes needed the track finished within the week, Nova Twins recorded and returned their parts in two days, with South adding "a few weird bass noises on there".

Composition

Lyrics and themes
Sykes stated that the songs were written to cope with the COVID-19 pandemic. In an interview with NME, Sykes would reveal a lot of different information about Post Human: Survival Horror. "Dear Diary," the introduction song was originally called "Survival Horror" and he wanted the song to be "fast and punky", as well as lyrically being about going into isolation and lockdown with Sykes expressing how he felt it made him feel like it was a zombie apocalypse with all of those feelings being written down into a diary to represent about how everyone feels being forced into isolation from society in an arising pandemic.

"Parasite Eve" was originally written about a Japanese virus that Sykes had read about and how he thought a huge virus could impact the future, which would end up shocking him when COVID-19 arose as he never thought something like that would happen so soon. The band went back and forth on thinking it was a good idea whether to release the song, as they felt it may have been "too offensive" before releasing the song with altered lyrics as "When we forget the infection, will we remember the lesson?" was originally "If we survive the infection." They eventually released "Parasite Eve", with the reasoning that people need a song like it, even if it is dark. The overall sound and themes of "Parasite Eve" would end up dictating the direction for the rest of the record.

Sykes would go on to explain how "Teardrops" is about the "bad news" people have been fed over the course of the past year and how he put into perspective how bad everything is, citing the murder of George Floyd. He also elaborated that it is easy to get numb to bad news because there is so much of it overwhelming everyone, which has a massive detrimental effect on mental health, because we do not react the way we should towards things as a direct consequence of this. Sykes's perspective on everything plays a vital role in what "Teardrops" means to him and his reflection towards society.

"Obey" was written about how people are told to co-operate with the status quo, particularly politically and socially, instead of demanding better. He would express how fear forces us to accept the way things are and how we just obey the system. The song was written from the perspective of the oppressor towards the people being oppressed, citing the example of a warning given by then US president Donald Trump to anti-racist protestors in the wake of the murder of George Floyd. The collaboration with Yungblud started when the band's keyboardist, songwriter and producer, Jordan Fish had the suggestion to get Yungblud on the track as that's what he felt the song needed.

Sykes did not have much to say about "Itch for the Cure (When Will We Be Free?)", though he stated how the themes of the song were directly tied and linked to the follow-up on the record "Kingslayer", featuring Babymetal. The song title for "Itch for the Cure (When Will We Be Free?)" would be a confirmed reference and nod to "Cure for the Itch" off of Linkin Park's Hybrid Theory.

He would go on to say about how the idea of "Kingslayer" originally came about when he was playing Call of Duty in Amsterdam, and the "Kingslayer" is what everyone wants to be. He used the idea as an analogy for the idea of then US president Donald Trump condemning ANTIFA as a "terrorist organisation" and the Extinction Rebellion causing chaos, as he felt that people have to go out and do what they feel is right, no matter the cost. Hence the themes and for "Kingslayer" to break the barriers of the reality. Sykes would go on to compare the sound of the song to something off their second studio album Suicide Season, and how the cute vocals of Babymetal on the chorus would make for a perfect contrast on "Kingslayer".

Sykes said that "1x1" was written about "the guilt that we as a society carry for what we've done to other species and ethnicities and other genders", while also taking inspiration from his past history and struggles with drug addiction, citing it as the most personal song on the record to him.

"One Day the Only Butterflies Left Will Be in Your Chest as You March Towards Your Death" features Evanescence vocalist Amy Lee. The song on the surface is about a relationship, but the hidden meaning is actually about the relationship between human and mother nature which Sykes describes as "abusive".

Influences and style
Musically, Post Human: Survival Horror has been described by critics as alternative metal, metalcore, electronic rock, nu metal, industrial metal, hard rock, electronica, EDM, and trancecore. The album is culturally cited as playing a significant role in solidifying the emerging nu metal revival movement of the late 2010s within the alternative music scene. Wall of Sound noted "thrash metal inspired riffs" on the song "Dear Diary,". They also compared the song "Teardrops" to Linkin Park and called it a nu metal track. According to The Independent, the song "Kingslayer" "employs thrash and screamo for a nightmare rave..." The song features Japanese metal band Babymetal. During an interview, Fish and Lee Malia revealed that Babymetal originally recorded their parts in English before Sykes asked them to re-record in Japanese.

Promotion and release
On 6 November 2019, the band released a new song titled "Ludens". It was released as the first single off the record and was also part of Death Stranding: Timefall, along with the news that the band are not planning to release an album again and instead wanted to release EPs in the future. On 25 June 2020, the band released the second single "Parasite Eve" along with a music video. It was expected to be released on 10 June 2020, but due to the George Floyd protests and the Black Lives Matter movement, the song was postponed to 25 June. That same day, the band also announced a new project that they have been working on titled Post Human which they said to be four EPs released throughout the next year which when combined would make an album.

On 2 September, the band released the third single, "Obey" in collaboration with English singer Yungblud with its corresponding music video. On 14 October, the band officially announced through social media that Post Human: Survival Horror was set for release on 30 October 2020. The band announced a 2021 UK arena tour in support of the release. On 22 October, a week before the release date, the fourth single "Teardrops" was released alongside an accompanying music video.

Reception

Critical reception

Post Human: Survival Horror received generally positive reviews from critics. At Metacritic, which assigns a normalised rating out of 100 to reviews from mainstream critics, the album has an average score of 82 out of 100, which indicates "universal acclaim" based on 8 reviews. Josh Gray of Clash was positive towards the release stating, "as indicated by its title, track names...this record boasts some serious Big Video Game Energy, elevated by the presence of Doom...composer Mick Gordon. Gordon helps the band inject some high-octane ferocity back into their music, and tracks like 'Obey' and 'Ludens' sound huge when paired with the rattle of your bullets mowing down wave after wave of aliens/zombies/Animal Crossing villagers." Wall of Sound praised the release saying it: "After years of going softer with their sound, trying new things to prove their worth, Bring Me The Horizon will surprise even the biggest of critic with Post Human: Survival Horror. It has a touch of everything they've been producing over the past decade and really cements them as one of the world's best rock bands getting about today."

Laviea Thomas of Gigwise was positive towards the release and felt that the release "[harnessed] their roots, whilst still keeping it fresh." Andrew Trendell of NME was positive towards the release and stated that some of the songs "[have the] pure aggression [that] harks back to the heavier vibes of 2008's Suicide Season and 2010's There Is a Hell..." Nick Ruskell of Kerrang! considered the release to be "cathartic" and "heavy" and that the release has [elements] of the familiar in amongst the creativity. Neil Z. Yeung of AllMusic praised the release stating "Survival Horror is one of the band's best distillations of their extremes, providing just enough brutality without sacrificing their evolving vision of how melodic and experimental a metal band can be."

The Independent was also positive towards the release, calling it "...a soundtrack fit for the end of the world." Callum Foulds of The Line of Best Fit stated that "...[the release captures] the bewildering phenomenon that is living through a worldwide pandemic."  Sputnikmusic was less positive stating "Post Human: Survival Horror...[is] the sonic equivalent to fast food, by which you'll consume it, enjoy it, and forget about it right after you've finished it, but it's fun while it lasts.

Accolades

Track listing

Notes
  "Parasite Eve" contains a sample of "Erghen Diado", written by Petar Lyondev and performed by the Bulgarian Female Vocal Choir.

Personnel
Credits adapted from the album's liner notes.

Bring Me the Horizon
 Oliver Sykes – lead vocals, production , engineering 
 Lee Malia – guitar 
 Jordan Fish – programming, production , backing vocals , piano , engineering , vocal engineering 
 Matthew Kean – bass 
 Matthew Nicholls – drums 

Additional musicians

 Mick Gordon – additional synthesizers, additional percussion, additional production 
 Toriel – backing vocals 
 Yungblud – vocals 
 Sam Winfield – gang vocals 
 Tom Millar – gang vocals 
 Giles Stelfox – gang vocals 
 Luke Burywood – gang vocals 
 Clayton Deakin – gang vocals 
 Jordan Baggs – gang vocals 
 Babymetal – vocals 
 Amy Love – vocals 
 Georgia South – additional bass 
 Amy Lee – vocals, background vocals 

Additional personnel

 Chris Athens – mastering
 Zakk Cervini – mixing , Yungblud recording and engineering 
 Carl Brown – drums recording 
 Dan Lancaster – drums engineering 
 Watametal – Babymetal recording and engineering 
 Ben Beetham – Nova Twins recording and engineering 
 Phil Gornell – assistant engineering 
 Claudio Adamo – assistant engineering 
 Alissic – artwork

Charts

Weekly charts

Year-end charts

Certifications

Release history

References

2020 EPs
Bring Me the Horizon albums
Hard rock albums by British artists
Nu metal albums by British artists
Metalcore albums by British artists
Electronic rock albums by British artists